Gornal may refer to the following places:

India
Gornal, Bidar, a settlement in the Bidar district of Karnataka
Gornal, Bijapur, a settlement in Bijapur district, Karnataka

Spain
Gornal (L'Hospitalet de Llobregat), near Barcelona
Gornal (Barcelona Metro), station serving Gornal
Can Tries – Gornal (Barcelona Metro), station serving Gornal
La Gornal, in Castellet i la Gornal, Catalonia

United Kingdom
Gornal, West Midlands, encompassing Upper Gornal, Lower Gornal and Gornal Wood; in Dudley, England
Gornal Athletic F.C., football team based in Lower Gornal
Gornal stone, a variety of limestone found in the area